Elachista chloropepla is a moth of the family Elachistidae. It is found in Australia.

References

Moths described in 1897
chloropepla
Moths of Australia